Pablo Esteban Badenier Martínez (born 6 September 1973) is a Chilean biochemical engineer and politician who was minister of the second government of Michelle Bachelet (2014−2018).

Badenier studied marine biology at the University of Valparaíso (UV) and has a master's degree in management and public policies at the University of Chile. An UV scholar, he has published on Environmental Institutionality and Environmental Project Management.

In the professional field, Badenier has served as regional director of the National Environmental Commission (CONAMA) of the Santiago Metropolitan Region (2003), as executive secretary of the Environment and Territory of the Ministry of Public Works and as associate researcher of the «Centro de Estudios para el dessarrollo» (Center for Development Studies). Likewise, he has been coordinator of the Environment and Energy Matrix Commission of the «Center for Democracy and Community» (CDC).

Political career
In 1995, he was president of the Student Federation of the University of Valparaíso. Similarly, Badenier was national president of the Christian Democratic Youth (2000−2003). Due to his performance in that position, he was elected president of the Christian Democrat Organization of America (CDOA) in 2002.

Bachelet's second term
In 2013, he was the territorial coordinator of Michelle Bachelet's presidential campaign.

In January 2014, Badenier was appointed by the now elected Bachelet as Minister for the Environment, in which he assumed on 11 March. Then, he resigned from office on 20 March 2017 to take over as campaign manager for Carolina Goic, who run in the 2017 general elections.

On 8 July 2017, he renounced to Goic's political command.

References

External links
 

1973 births
Living people
Government ministers of Chile
Chilean people of French descent
University of Valparaíso alumni
University of Chile alumni
21st-century Chilean politicians
Christian Democratic Party (Chile) politicians
People from Santiago
Environment ministers